Cruz Azul is a Mexican professional association football  club based in Mexico City, Mexico. 

Cruz Azul may also refer to:

 Ciudad Cooperativa Cruz Azul, an industrial city located in Hidalgo, Mexico.
 Cooperativa La Cruz Azul S.C.L., an industrial company.
 Cemento Cruz Azul, a cement brand.
 Cruz Azul (Women)
 Cruz Azul Hidalgo, a Mexican professional football club, affiliated to Cruz Azul, based in Hidalgo.
 Cruz Azul Premier, a Mexican football club competing in the Mexican third division.
 Cruz Azul Reserves, Cruz Azul's under-15, under-17 and under-20 teams.
 C.D. Cruz Azul, a Honduran professional football club based in San José de Colinas.
 Cruz Azul (Samoa), a Samoan football club.
 Cruz Azul Mexicana, a Mexican-American organization.